Azan Faqir, born Shah Miran, also known as Ajan Pir, Hazrat Shah Miran, and Shah Milan (presumably from Miran), was a Sufi Syed, poet, Muslim preacher and saint from the 17th century who came from Baghdad or as per some family sources, Badaun in western UP to settle in the Sibsagar area of Assam in the north-eastern part of India, where he helped to unify the people of the Brahmaputra valley, and to reform, reinforce and stabilise Islam in the region of Assam. The nickname Azan came from his habit of calling azan. He came to Assam in about 1630 from Iraq, that is, approximately 200 years after the birth of Srimanta Sankardev

According to one version his name was "Hazarat Shah Syed Mainuddin". He is particularly known for his Zikr and Zari, two forms of devotional songs, that draw from local musical traditions and have striking similarities with borgeets of Srimanta Sankardeva, the 16th-century saint-scholar from Assam. In addition, the late renowned author and Sahitya Akademi award winner Syed Abdul Malik states that Azan Fakir was a preacher with profound mastery over the Qur’an, the Hadith and Islamic philosophy.

Career
Azan Fakir was a disciple of Khwaja Nizamuddin Auliya in Baghdad. He came to Assam accompanied by his brother Shah Navi. He married an Ahom woman of high social stature and settled at Gorgaon, near modern Sibsagar town.

As a Pir he composed Zikrs (a type of spiritual song). Originally he spoke Arabic, but he completely mastered the language of the land he adopted, permitting comparison of his songs to those of his Vaishnava contemporaries.

The conspiracy
In course of time his influence spread, he acquired a good number of followers and earned the enmity of an Ahom Muslim official, Rupai Dadhora, who by conspiracy convinced the Ahom king that Azan Fakir was a Mughal spy and had orders passed for plucking out the Pir's eyes. The Pir, according to some songs, had two earthen pots brought into which he let his "two eyes drop".He then asked the soldiers to throw the pots into the nearby Dikhow River instead of taking them to the King.

Aftermath
The king was alarmed and for atonement made land grants to Ajan Fakir at Soraguri Chapari, near Sibsagar and had a matha built for him. This place on the bank of Brahmaputra has become a holy place with Ajan Pir's Dargah where an annual urs is held.

His dargah is at Saraguri Chapari near Sibsagar town.

See also
Ajan Faquir Saheb, a 2008 Assamese-language film about him.... 
Azan Fakir composed 160 zikir and zari but 90 are found now

References

 
 
 

Religion in Assam
People from Baghdad
17th-century Indian people
17th century in the Ahom kingdom
Indian Sufis
Indian people of Iraqi descent
People from Assam